The Acropolis International Tournament 2010 was a basketball tournament held in OAKA Indoor Hall in Athens, Greece, from August 17 until August 19, 2010. This was the 24th edition of the Acropolis International Basketball Tournament. The four participating teams were Greece, Serbia, Canada, and Slovenia.

Venues

Participating teams

Standings 

|-bgcolor="gold"

|}

Tiebreaker 
Slovenia, Serbia and Canada all had 1 win and 2 losses. Since each team had won one of the two games with the other teams (excluding Greece, who had a 3–0 record), a second tiebreaker was used to determine the second, third, and fourth place. Compared among the other tied teams, Slovenia had an overall 14 point difference, Serbia had a -3 point difference and Canada had a -11 point difference. The teams were ranked by the point difference from highest to lowest. Thus, Slovenia won the silver medal, Serbia won the bronze, and Canada was left with fourth place.

Results

Final standing

Games

Greece vs. Canada 
The Greeks completely thrashed Canada in game one of the Acropolis tournament, winning 123–49. The team set a new record for the highest point difference in an Acropolis tournament, 74 points. Canada's head coach blamed the long trip from Canada to Greece, and a lack of energy as a result. The Greeks' Schortsanitis put down 24 points, before sustaining an injury late in the third quarter, while Calathes had 10 assists.

Greece vs. Serbia 
Serbian head coach Dušan Ivković was ejected with 6:00 remaining in the fourth quarter after receiving his second technical foul of the game.

Bench clearing brawl
With 2:40 left in the game and Greece up by one point, the home team had possession. Receiving a back pass from driving Dimitris Diamantidis who drew a double team, wide-open Greek power forward Antonis Fotsis attempted a three-point shot, while Serbian point guard Miloš Teodosić ran over to cover him and got called for a foul in the process.

Within seconds, as Teodosić began complaining to the referee over the call, an agitated Fotsis came over and interrupted Teodosić's attempt at talking to the ref by getting in Teodosić's face with a raised hand and a pointed finger, seemingly lecturing and/or threatening him over what had just occurred. Due to a considerable size advantage, the 2.09 m and 113 kg Fotsis easily imposed himself onto the 1.96 m and 95 kg Teodosić, pushing him back as Diamantidis and Novica Veličković, as well as one of the referees, quickly joined in an attempt to separate the two. With three people now holding Fotsis and Teodosić apart, Fotsis managed to grab a hold of both of Teodosić's arms to which Teodosić reacted by trying to free himself, moving his hand towards Fotsis' face. Already well agitated, Fotsis reacted by spitting in Teodosić's face as Marko Kešelj now also joined the group holding the two. Fotsis followed by grabbing the back of Teodosić's head with the left hand and attempting to punch him with the right, but couldn't throw the punch because of being held back by the people around him. Fotsis' spitting and attempted punching of Teodosić drew more players into the fight as Serbian captain Nenad Krstić jumped in from the back, grabbing Fotsis' face with an open hand while Veličković proceeded to do the same, managing to wrestle Fotsis away from Teodosić.

Mayhem then engulfed the entire court as both squads - including the benches and team officials - became involved. The pack moved to the bench where Krstić threw a chair that hit Ioannis Bourousis in the head; Bourousis was not scheduled to appear on the court due to injury and was watching the game on the bench.

After the brawl, for safety reasons, the game was abandoned with the final score standing at 74-73 for Greece, while Krstić was arrested and held overnight for assaulting Bourousis.

For their involvement in the brawl, Krstic was suspended for the first three games in the 2010 FIBA World Championship tournament and fined CHF 45,000 (€42,800/USD $46,000), while Teodosic, Fotsis and Sofoklis Schortsanitis were suspended for the first two games. Both teams were also fined CHF 20,000 (€19,000/USD$20,500) by FIBA.

References

External links
Acropolis Cup 2010 Results

Acropolis International Basketball Tournament
2010–11 in Greek basketball
2010–11 in Slovenian basketball
2010–11 in Serbian basketball
2010–11 in Canadian basketball